William Kaplan (born 24 May 1957) is a Canadian lawyer and writer.

Biography
Born in Toronto, Ontario, Kaplan is the son of Igor Kaplan and Cara Cherniak. He graduated from the University of Toronto in 1980 with a Bachelor of Arts degree. He went on to Osgoode Hall Law School at York University, where he graduated in 1983 with a Bachelor of Laws. He graduated from the University of Toronto in 1985 with a Master of Arts, and from Stanford University Law School in 1988 with a J.S.D. degree.

He is married to Susan Krever, and their children are Maxwell Bernard, Simon Avery, and Hannah Beth.

Kaplan was a professor at the University of Ottawa Law School from 1989–2001, and also worked during that time in private practice as a mediator and investigator. He is currently in private practice in Toronto, Ontario. His awards from the Law Society of Upper Canada have included the Law Society Medal in 1999, and an Honorary L.L.D. in 2002. In 2010 the government of Ontario awarded him the 2009 David W. Mundell medal.

Writings 
Kaplan is best known for his work as a writer and editor, especially for his two books on the Airbus Affair, which involved former Canadian Prime Minister Brian Mulroney, the controversial German-Canadian lobbyist and businessman Karlheinz Schreiber, and Stevie Cameron, whose role in the Airbus Affair is fully documented in Kaplan's book A Secret Trial: Brian Mulroney, Stevie Cameron and the Public Trust. This situation has been of ongoing interest for some 20 years, with developments into the present time. Writing in The Globe and Mail in 2003, Kaplan first broke the story of the large cash payments from Schreiber to Mulroney, which had been kept secret for ten years. He has continued to analyze and comment on these topics for that newspaper in late 2007 and early 2008, when both Schreiber and Mulroney appeared before the House of Commons of Canada Ethics Committee, and a public inquiry was called by Prime Minister Stephen Harper, with terms of reference for the public inquiry delivered by special adviser David Lloyd Johnston on 11 January 2008.

 Why Dissent Matters: Because Some People See Things The Rest of Us Miss, by William Kaplan, Toronto 2017, McGill-Queen's University Press, .
 Everything that Floats: Pat Sullivan, Hal Banks and the Seamen's Unions of Canada, by William Kaplan, Toronto 1987, University of Toronto Press, .
 State and Salvation: The Jehovah's Witnesses & Their Fight for Civil Rights, by William Kaplan, Toronto 1989, University of Toronto Press.
 Belonging: The Meaning and Future of Canadian Citizenship, edited by William Kaplan, Montreal 1992, McGill-Queen's University Press, .
 Law, Policy, and International Justice, edited by William Kaplan and Donald McRae, Montreal 1993, McGill-Queen's University Press, .
 Presumed Guilty: Brian Mulroney, the Airbus Affair, and the Government of Canada, by William Kaplan, 1998, .
 One More Border: The True Story of One Family's Escape from War-Torn Europe, by William Kaplan, Toronto 1998, Groundwood Books.
 A Secret Trial: Brian Mulroney, Stevie Cameron, and the Public Trust, by William Kaplan, Montreal 2004, McGill-Queen's University Press, .

External links
William Kaplan's webpage

1957 births
Living people
Lawyers in Ontario
Canadian legal scholars
Canadian non-fiction writers
Academic staff of the University of Ottawa
University of Toronto alumni
York University alumni
Stanford University alumni
Writers from Toronto
Osgoode Hall Law School alumni